Blidi Bertrand Wreh-Wilson (born December 5, 1989) is an American football cornerback who is a free agent. He was drafted by the Tennessee Titans in the third round of the 2013 NFL Draft. He played college football at University of Connecticut.

Early years
Blidi attended General McLane High School in Edinboro, Pennsylvania, where he was a four-sport star in football, basketball, track and soccer. He played for the General McLane Lancers high school football team and for General McLane's 2007 PIAA AAA Basketball State Championship team, which in the same year won the PIAA AAA Football State Championship. This made General McLane the first high school in PIAA history to accomplish such a feat. Wreh-Wilson was not on the football team as he was on the soccer team. Switching fall sports in his senior year from soccer to football, Wreh-Wilson was an honorable mention all-state pick as a senior. Rated only a two-star recruit by Rivals, he committed to Connecticut over an offer from Buffalo. In track, he ran the 100-meter dash in 11.4 seconds, and the 400-meter dash in 51.03 seconds.

College career
While attending the University of Connecticut, Wreh-Wilson played for the Connecticut Huskies football team from 2008 to 2012.

After being redshirted in 2008, Wreh-Wilson saw action in all 13 games of the 2009 season. He started nine games, including the final seven games of the season, and recorded a total of 40 tackles and one interception.

Wreh-Wilson started all 13 games for the Huskies at the cornerback position in 2010.  He had four interceptions on the season, two of which were returned for touchdowns, and also recorded 57 tackles, five pass deflections, and one fumble recovery.

In the 2011 season, Wreh-Wilson only played in eight games due to a knee injury, but managed to start all eight games, and recorded 37 tackles, including two for a loss, along with two interceptions and seven pass deflections.

As a senior in 2012, Wreh-Wilson played in and started 11 games, and was honored as the team's Most Valuable Player.  He was also a second-team All-Big East selection and recorded 47 tackles, nine pass deflections, and an interception.

Professional career

Tennessee Titans
The Tennessee Titans chose Wreh-Wilson in the third round, with the 70th overall pick, of the 2013 NFL Draft. He signed his four-year rookie contract with the Titans on June 20, 2013. As a rookie, he played in 13 games in a reserve role and contributed nine tackles, one tackle for loss, one pass defensed, and one forced fumble while adding five tackles and one forced fumble on special teams.

In 2014, Wreh-Wilson started 11 games at cornerback and ranked second on the team with 10 passes defensed. He recorded 57 tackles, an interception, and a quarterback pressure in the 2014 season.

On August 28, 2016, Wreh-Wilson was waived by the Titans.

Atlanta Falcons
On November 29, 2016, Wreh-Wilson was signed by the Atlanta Falcons. He was released by the Falcons on December 9, 2016, but he was re-signed three days later. He was inactive for the Falcons' 34-28 overtime loss to the New England Patriots in the Super Bowl.

On March 10, 2017, Wreh-Wilson signed a one-year contract with the Falcons.

On March 10, 2018, Wreh-Wilson signed a one-year contract extension with the Falcons.

On February 22, 2019, Wreh-Wilson signed another one-year contract extension with the Falcons.

On March 31, 2020, Wreh-Wilson re-signed with the Falcons.
In week 3 of the 2020 season against the Chicago Bears, he recorded his first interception as a Falcon during the 30–26 loss. 
In week 8, against the Carolina Panthers on Thursday Night Football, Wreh-Wilson intercepted a pass thrown by Teddy Bridgewater late in the fourth quarter to secure a 25–17 Falcons' victory.

Las Vegas Raiders
On June 9, 2021, Wreh-Wilson signed with the Las Vegas Raiders He was released on August 31, 2021.

Tampa Bay Buccaneers
On October 18, 2021, Wreh-Wilson was signed to the Tampa Bay Buccaneers practice squad. He appeared in one game before he was released on January 18, 2022.

Personal life
Wreh-Wilson's parents are from Liberia. His father is of Kru descent.

References

External links
UCONN Huskies bio

1989 births
Living people
People from Erie County, Pennsylvania
American football cornerbacks
American people of Liberian descent
UConn Huskies football players
Players of American football from Pennsylvania
Tennessee Titans players
Atlanta Falcons players
Las Vegas Raiders players
Tampa Bay Buccaneers players